Anne Rigney is a contemporary Irish visual artist and sculptor.

Biography
Born to parents Rita and Vincent, Anne Rigney is originally from Mount Temple, County Westmeath, but has made Knockcroghery, County Roscommon her home.

Rigney studied at Athlone Institute of Technology, graduating in Art and Design. She cofounded professional artists' group Working Artists Roscommon and is a member of Visual Artists Ireland.

Style of work
Rigney's work is influenced heavily by the area in which she lives and the rural Irish countryside in general, as well as her personal life experiences. The style of work is mainly abstract; the media she uses includes oil paint, watercolour, acrylics, mixed-media and found objects.

Exhibitions and events

Public collections

Rigney's works have been acquired by the following public art collections:
Office of Public Works
Athlone Institute of Technology
Roscommon County Council
Irish Distillers

Awards, recognition and residencies

Arts Council Travel Award for cultural events in Krakow, Poland
Residency at the Tyrone Guthrie Centre in Monaghan

Activism
In early 2015 Anne Rigney campaigned publicly for same-sex marriage equality in the lead up to the referendum on the question held in Ireland that year, writing a poem and creating a video which was published on YouTube and the VoteWithUs.org website.

In July 2015 Rigney called for the Australian public to follow Ireland's lead and introduce equal marriage. The Daily Telegraph published an article by Rigney in October 2016 in which she appealed directly to Australian parents to support their gay children and campaign for equal marriage, writing "Talk to your politicians. Hold rallies. Write letters to papers. Do not stand idly by. Your children need you."

References

External links
 
 Anne Rigney on Instagram

Abstract painters
Irish contemporary artists
20th-century Irish painters
21st-century Irish painters
Irish sculptors
20th-century sculptors
Year of birth missing (living people)
People from County Westmeath
People from County Roscommon
Alumni of Athlone Institute of Technology
Irish women painters
Living people